Stephanie Brown is a superheroine appearing in American comic books published by DC Comics, most commonly in association with Batman. The character first appeared in Detective Comics #647 (June 1992), and was created by Chuck Dixon and Tom Lyle.

The daughter of the criminal Cluemaster, the character originated as the amateur crime-fighter Spoiler. Later, she briefly became the fourth Robin and third Batgirl. She has also served as the love interest/girlfriend of the third Robin, Tim Drake. From 2009 to 2011, she was the star of her own ongoing Batgirl comic book series. In 2014, following a company-wide relaunch of all DC Comics titles as the New 52 in 2011, the character returned to the Spoiler identity in Batman Eternal, completely resetting her to the beginning of her crime fighting career. She is the only character to have been both Robin and Batgirl in mainstream continuity.

Stephanie Brown appeared in the second season of the Arrowverse series Batwoman, portrayed by Morgan Kohan. Anna Lore portrays her in Gotham Knights.

Publication history
Stephanie Brown was introduced in a three-issue story arc in Detective Comics #647–649 in which writer Chuck Dixon reinvented a villain called the Cluemaster. Dixon created the Cluemaster's daughter, Stephanie, as simply a plot device for this story, seeking to "spoil" her father's plans. Even so, the character was well received by fans. The following year, Dixon launched the first ongoing Robin series and featured the Spoiler as a foil and love interest for Tim Drake. The character was at the center of a high-profile teen pregnancy storyline in 1998, which caused Wizard Magazine to name Robin the best ongoing comic book of the year. Stephanie remained an integral part of the Robin supporting cast for over a decade, until her death in the 2004 crossover storyline Batman: War Games.

Her death was revealed to have been faked in a 2008 story, and she became the eponymous lead character in the 2009 Batgirl series written by Bryan Q. Miller, with pencils by Lee Garbett. The title was canceled after 24 issues and replaced with a new Batgirl series starring Barbara Gordon as part of the New 52 relaunch.

Controversy
There was some controversy in the fan community about both the character's death by torture and the fact that even though she served as Robin for a time, she received no monument or memorial in the Batcave during the years of her apparent death, unlike the second Robin, Jason Todd.

Regarding the former issue, at the 2011 Auckland Writers and Readers Festival, the former Batgirl writer Dylan Horrocks said that the writers were told from the start that Spoiler would die in this crossover and she was made Robin "purely as a trick to play on the readers, that we would fool them into thinking that the big event [War Games] was that Stephanie Brown would become Robin". The decision was unpopular with both him and Nightwing writer Devin Grayson, and he felt "pleased and vindicated" over the eventual controversy.

During a Q&A at a convention in March 2007, DC executive editor Dan DiDio responded to questions about the absence of a Stephanie tribute from the Batcave, saying that the official position of DC Comics is that "She was never really a Robin", despite on-panel claims to the contrary. When Alfred Pennyworth asks if Batman's acceptance of Stephanie as Robin was conceived by him as only a temporary measure from the outset and constituted part of an effort to lure Tim back to the cape, Batman evades the question. However, when a dying Stephanie asks, "Was I ever really Robin?", Batman answers, "Of course you were." However, her memorial has been present in different publications since the controversy arose.

The New 52 publication
In September 2011, The New 52 rebooted DC's continuity. In this new timeline, Barbara Gordon takes the role of Batgirl once again, with Stephanie Brown no longer existing in mainstream continuity. In June 2012, fans of the character attempted a letter movement, sending waffles, waffle mix, and/or letters to the editors, expressing a wish to see her published once more. Shortly thereafter, Dan DiDio claimed in an interview that about ten waffles had arrived and expressed doubt that her fandom was really as strong as it appeared.

On October 11, 2013, writer Scott Snyder announced at New York Comic Con that Brown would appear as Spoiler beginning in the third issue of DC's 2014 weekly series Batman Eternal. Brown made her first New 52 appearance in Batman (vol. 2) #28, a teaser issue for Batman Eternal.

Fictional character biography
Stephanie Brown is the daughter of the Cluemaster, one of Gotham City's third-rate criminals. Her father spent most of her childhood in jail or away from the family. He claims to be rehabilitated upon his return to Gotham, but Stephanie becomes furious when she discovers that he is actually returning to crime, this time not leaving his trademark clues behind. She decides something needs to be done.

The Spoiler

Stephanie Brown tailors a costume for herself, and calls herself "the Spoiler" due to her attempts to spoil her father's plans. She learns where her father is hiding out, finds out his plans, and leaves clues so that the police and Batman could stop him. Robin (Tim Drake) tracks her down and, after a few brief confrontations, helps capture Cluemaster. Although she initially wishes to kill her father, Batman convinces her to allow him to be arrested.

Each time Cluemaster escapes or starts some new plan, Stephanie dons her costume again. Eventually, she decides she likes being a superhero, and she begins regular patrols as Spoiler. This also brings her into regular contact with Robin, on whom she has a bit of a crush. At first, Robin thinks of her as a pest, but later comes to enjoy her company. He was dating Ariana Dzerchenko at the time. However, the two sometimes work as partners, and during a point in which Robin and Ariana were unable to see each other, he and Stephanie grew even closer. Robin soon realizes that his feelings for Stephanie have grown into something more, and, after breaking up with Ariana, he begins dating Stephanie. Unfortunately, because Robin needs to maintain the secrecy of Batman and his allies, Robin is unable to reveal his true identity to Spoiler. At first, she seems happy with this arrangement.

Stephanie then finds out she is pregnant by an ex-boyfriend who had run from Gotham City after the earthquake depicted in Batman: Cataclysm. Robin, under the alias Alvin Draper, takes Stephanie to Lamaze classes, and the two become even closer. Robin moves to Keystone City during the last few months of her pregnancy, but he returns to her when she is giving birth. With Robin's help, she is able to cope with placing her child up for adoption. Although a painful experience, she feels it best to give her daughter a chance at a better life.

Soon after, Robin's father sends him away to boarding school, and the couple is forced into a long-distance relationship, made even more complicated by the fact that Stephanie still did not know his real name. During his time away, Robin befriends a girl named Star. One night, after seeing her go into an alley with some suspicious-looking people, Robin decides to follow her in costume. He runs into Stephanie, also on patrol, and she follows him as he tracks down Star to a gang meeting that erupts in a violent shootout. He saves Star, but Stephanie is convinced that he is cheating on her, and refuses to see him afterward.

Shortly after this, Robin disappears from Gotham for several days, because he is in Tibet on a secret mission. In his absence, Spoiler realizes that she still wants to be with him. Batman approaches Spoiler to try to discover Tim's whereabouts, and then offers to train her. He also tells her Robin's real name, and this betrayal by Batman drives a wedge between the two. Spoiler begins to train with Batman, Batgirl, and, briefly, the Birds of Prey.

Stephanie and Tim, as she now knows him, reconcile. Even after Batman, having decided that she was not crime fighter material, tells her to hang up her costume and have the Birds of Prey stop mentoring her, she still patrols secretly, in addition to going on occasional dates with Robin in their civilian identities. When the U.S. government comes to Stephanie and her mother and tells her that Cluemaster had died while working for the Suicide Squad, Stephanie is shocked. She temporarily cuts off ties with Tim and goes on a vigilante rampage, hunting down the Riddler, her father's former associate, to try to get a better idea of who he had been in life. Eventually, she makes peace with his memory, and she and Tim rekindle their relationship.

Stephanie is later injured during Tim's battle with the occult hitman Johnny Warlock breaking her leg. In a fit of rage, Tim apparently beats Warlock to death (though he would later be magically resurrected), which sends him into a deep, angry depression. He refuses to speak with Stephanie, whom he blames for him killing Warlock.

Robin

Stephanie Brown snaps Tim Drake out of his depression just as his father Jack Drake discovers he is Robin. After Warlock's death, Tim's father orders him to hang up his cape, and Tim is forced to live a normal life for a time. One day after school, Stephanie attempts to surprise Tim with a visit. As she arrives, however, she catches a female classmate, Darla Aquista, attempting to seduce him. Assuming that Tim is being unfaithful, she breaks off ties with Tim and angrily decides to put her attention elsewhere. Creating a homemade Robin costume, Stephanie sneaks into the Batcave and demands that Batman train her as the new Robin. Batman reluctantly accepts her as the new Robin, puts her through several months of intensive training, and makes her a better costume with roughly the same design as Tim's. As Robin, she patrols with Batman, but he thinks she isn't skilled enough to replace Tim. Batman later fires her after she disobeys him in the field.

In an effort to prove her worth to Batman, Stephanie steals one of his long-term plans for dealing with the entirety of Gotham's criminal underworld, arranging a meeting to bring them all together. Since this plan is predicated on the involvement of "Matches Malone" who, unbeknownst to her, is a persona that Batman uses to infiltrate the underworld, it quickly spins out of control. The result is a citywide gang war in which Stephanie is captured by the Black Mask. She is tortured extensively by Black Mask to get information about Batman, as well as learning enough information to allow him to take control of Batman's plan and assume command of the gangs himself. Although she escapes and makes her way to a hospital, she is severely injured, and supposedly dies in a hospital bed as Batman sits beside her.

Batman later finds evidence that a vital medical treatment that could have saved Stephanie's life had been denied by Doctor Leslie Thompkins. When Batman confronts the doctor, Thompkins claims she willfully withheld such treatment to send a warning to any of Gotham's youth intending to follow Stephanie's example.

Posthumous appearances

Following her death, Stephanie Brown appears twice in the Batgirl series. The first time, in Batgirl #62, Cassandra Cain meets her during a near death experience. Then, in Batgirl #72–73, Cassandra is near death following a battle with Mad Dog when Stephanie's "ghost" appears before her again and informs Cassandra of her true parentage and of Blüdhaven's destruction. During the Titans East storyline, a glass case with Stephanie's Spoiler costume (alongside cases with clothing representing Tim Drake's parents and Conner Kent) is in a room Deathstroke uses to torture Robin. Barbara Gordon uses photos of her autopsy to dissuade another young superheroine, Misfit, from using the name Batgirl. In Booster Gold (vol. 2) #5, Rip Hunter's chalk board shows the phrase "No Trophy = Stephanie?" written on it. In Gotham Underground, an unidentified female in a Spoiler costume (later revealed to be Stephanie) is shown working for the Penguin.

Spoiler returns
In the events following The Resurrection of Ra's al Ghul, Robin follows the trail of a female thief called Violet. This leads him to reunite with his friend Ives during social service classes at St. Camillus Cathedral. He also has random encounters with a blonde student in high school that trigger his memories of Stephanie. During his quest to find Violet, he is followed by a character dressed as Spoiler. This Spoiler reveals herself to Robin, trying to warn him that Violet led him to an ambush. Believing someone else is dressing up as Spoiler, Robin falls into Violet's trap after Spoiler addresses him by his real name.

After escaping the ambush, Robin and Batman track down the woman in a bid to force her to stop imitating Stephanie. When confronted, she removes her mask and reveals that she is indeed Stephanie, with Leslie Thompkins having faked her death. Batman reveals his doubts about her death leading him to not erect a memorial for her in the Batcave. Since her secret identity had been compromised, Leslie faked her death so villains could not use her against Batman as Black Mask had done. Living with Leslie in Africa under an alias, Stephanie had been performing volunteer work until an attack from a local witch-hunting tribe prompted her to return to crimefighting, and subsequently to Gotham. Stephanie reunites with her mother, enrolls in Tim's high school, and rejoins the Bat-Family.

Before being revealed to Robin and Batman, Stephanie works freelance for the Penguin and gets information that helps him in his gang wars. She abruptly stops aiding him, after which he loses the advantage and leaves Gotham. She sends Penguin a note apologizing for leaving him when he needed her the most.

During the Batman R.I.P. storyline, Stephanie played the role of both ally and betrayer to Robin. Following Batman's disappearance and descent into madness, Robin attempts to balance his search for Bruce with his attempts to maintain control over Gotham's criminals. Tim asks that Stephanie help him locate Batman, but having anticipated his downfall, Batman has ordered Stephanie to hinder the investigation, believing that Tim needs to learn how to handle things on his own. Tim discovers the deception, and pulls away from his relationship with Stephanie. Unbeknownst to Tim, Batman has also ordered Stephanie to make Robin a stronger hero by challenging him, so Stephanie hires the Scarab, an assassin she encountered while she was Robin. After ordering the Scarab to use non-lethal methods, she also begins working with Tim's enemy, the General, who eventually tries to kill her. Her martial arts skills were able to save her from getting shot in the head—she is instead shot in the shoulder, escaping just in time to save Tim's life when the Scarab goes rogue.

The General, now using the identity of Anarky, decides to plunge Gotham into anarchy by starting a citywide gang war, and Stephanie aids Robin in keeping order and defeating the General. Afterward, Robin reveals that he is aware that Stephanie had worked with the villains to help him become a better Robin under Batman's orders. He notes that her actions were successful, but her methods were questionable. No longer in love with Stephanie, Robin orders her to abandon the Spoiler identity as he can no longer trust her.

In Batman and the Outsiders (vol. 2) #13, Batgirl recruits Spoiler and Vigilante to a new network of heroes that will replace Batman, who is missing after the Batman R.I.P. storyline. She is able to turn completely invisible while fighting the Vigilante, though Fabian Nicieza, current writer of the Robin title, said he knew nothing about it. However, in Gotham Gazette: Batman Alive, Nicieza incorporates the new ability, with Robin stating she stole the technology to make herself invisible.

In Teen Titans (vol. 3) #66, Stephanie appeared as one of the potential candidates to help fill Miss Martian's vacant seat on the team's roster. She was drawn into a fight with Bombshell, who mocked her and accused her of being a coward. In the end, Robin revealed that Stephanie had not come to join the Titans, but instead to help him with his preparations to leave the team.

In the Red Robin series, Stephanie and Dick Grayson (now, the new Batman, following Bruce Wayne's apparent death) become concerned about Tim after Dick transfers the mantle of Robin from Tim to Damian Wayne. Furious, Tim comes to believe that Bruce is still alive, and goes in search of him under the guise of Red Robin. When he cuts off all communication with the Bat-Family and the Teen Titans, Stephanie approaches Tim in his private base. This action, however, only infuriates Tim more. Kicking her in the chest after she sneaks up on him, he reiterates that he cannot trust her and orders her not to follow him on his mission, leading her to return to Gotham.

Batgirl

Stephanie Brown graduates from high school off-panel, is a student at Gotham University, and is still living with her mother. Cassandra Cain has apparently become disillusioned following Bruce Wayne's apparent death and gives Stephanie her Batgirl costume. After operating as the new Batgirl in Cain's costume, Stephanie is confronted by Barbara Gordon who was notified of her activities by Dick Grayson. Barbara tried to reason with Stephanie to get her to stop being a vigilante, as she still saw Stephanie as an impetuous youth, remembering her role in causing a citywide gang war and her near-death experience at Black Mask's hands. However, a new type of recreational drug is hitting the streets of Gotham known as "Thrill", which they discover was manufactured by the Scarecrow and the second Black Mask, and the two women need each other to stop the drug trade. Stephanie eventually confronts and defeats the Scarecrow, impressing Barbara and proving that she now has the maturity and the responsibility to face her fears and failures. Barbara decides to allow Stephanie to continue on as Batgirl. Barbara later takes a job as an assistant professor at Stephanie's school to continue to keep in contact with her. Barbara also designs a costume for Stephanie to replace Cassandra's tattered costume, incorporating various elements of both the Spoiler and previous Batgirl costumes.

As Stephanie is taking steps to balance her double-life as a college student and a vigilante, Barbara makes a test run on Stephanie's Batsuit, which includes monitoring Stephanie's vital signs and allowing both women to communicate through wireless links. After some warm-up against minor criminals, Stephanie finds herself against Livewire who causes a blackout in the city while draining its power. Fortunately, Stephanie's costume is insulated, and she is able to overpower the villainess. Stephanie also develops an attraction to Gotham PD's newest young recruit who just transferred from Coast City PD, Detective Nicholas "St. Nick" Gage, who is also attracted to her as Batgirl. However, this budding romance is complicated by Commissioner Gordon, who is trying to set the young detective up on a blind date with Barbara. The Commissioner finds their mutual attraction unsettling, because despite the fact that Batgirl's identity is yet unknown to him, Gordon knows that the superheroine is still a teenager. Her activities also have led her and Barbara into conflict with the new Dynamic Duo, Batman (Dick Grayson) and Robin (Damian Wayne). However, even though Stephanie and Damian initially do not get along, he is intrigued by her motivations to be a vigilante.

While meeting a classmate, Francisco, Stephanie is left unconscious after being shot while trying to protect him from a group of kidnappers. Stephanie survives the gunshot wound and it is later revealed that Francisco's real name is Fernando Garcia, a son of a real estate mogul whose father's unethical business practices have led to him becoming a target. Because of Garcia's abduction, Stephanie and Barbara join forces with Batman and Robin, as some of the Gotham rogues are involved in the crime, including Roulette. After they rescue Garcia, Dick, after seeing Stephanie's fight with Roxy Rocket, although still not completely approving of her as Batgirl, realizes that she reminds him of Barbara when she was in the role, so he allows Barbara to continue training Stephanie. Stephanie also receives a new state-of-the-art transportation known as the Ricochet (based from Batman's Batcycle designs) from Barbara.

Stephanie was later asked by Barbara to shut down the vigilante operations of John Raymond, a wealthy young superhero who had been giving powerful exo-suits to a number of people in hopes of creating a nationwide army of crime-fighters he dubbed "Web Hosts". After being convinced by John that he could keep his Web Hosts in line, Stephanie and Barbara agreed to not only allow him to continue his vigilante actions, but also upgrade the equipment he was using.

In the first part of the Red Robin/Batgirl crossover story "Collision", Tim Drake returns to Gotham with proof that Bruce Wayne is not only still alive but also lost in time. At the same time, immortal terrorist Ra's al Ghul begins his attack to destroy everything the Wayne family has built, in response to Tim crippling his League of Assassins organization during his quest. Tim returns to the Batcave to seek the current Batman's aid, only to find Stephanie as Batgirl. After their confrontation, Stephanie and Tim reluctantly work together to protect Ra's al Ghul's possible targets. After saving Leslie Thompkins from the League, Tim attempts to rekindle his and Stephanie's old romance. She rejects these advances before Prudence, another member of Ra's al Ghul's men, interrupts them with her assignment to target the new Batgirl. Stephanie, however, bested the assassin in combat. Prudence subsequently reveals her true allegiance to Tim, which apparently overcomes her supposed loyalty to The Demon's Head. After narrowly escaping Tim's safehouse (which the League of Assassins had booby-trapped before the three arrived), they encounter members of another organization of assassins, the Council of Spiders. The League of Assassins are eventually defeated after Tim thwarts Ra's al Ghul's plan strategically with Bruce Wayne's will that was made before his disappearance.

Stephanie would also show up against her mentor's nemesis, the Calculator, with his daughter, Wendy Harris, to rescue Barbara and Gotham itself after the villain injects nanites into the citizens and heroes of the city and controls them.

In another storyline, Stephanie made a cameo appearance as a member of the assault team led by Dick Grayson to go against the new Black Mask.

She later appears alongside Batwoman and fellow teen superheroines Stargirl, Supergirl, and Lightning as part of an all-female team created by Wonder Woman to repel Professor Ivo's faux-alien invasion of Washington, D.C.

After Bruce Wayne's return, it is revealed that the true reason Cassandra Cain handed over her Batgirl mantle to Stephanie was that she was acting under her mentor's order in the event of his death or disappearance.

Around this time, during The Lesson arc, Stephanie was forced to deal with a mysterious group known as The Order of the Scythe, who briefly framed her for murdering a student on her campus. During her final adventure as Batgirl, Stephanie confronts her father and is ensnared by a sample of Black Mercy. Stephanie experiences a number of future events, including a time-travelling adventure with Cassandra and Barbara, the Royal Flush Gang attacking her at her college graduation, and eventually training the new Batgirl, a girl named Nell. She ultimately breaks free from the Black Mercy and confides in Barbara that despite the wonderful things she experienced while in the fantasy world, she preferred to live in the here and now.

During the Convergence storyline, Stephanie (who still uses the Batgirl title) is chosen as the champion of her version of Gotham City, and must fight other city's champions if they are to survive.

The New 52
In the New 52, a 2011 reboot of the DC Universe, Stephanie Brown's history was completely removed from continuity. She makes her first appearance in the new mainstream continuity as Spoiler in Batman (vol. 2) #28 (April 2014), a sneak peek into the future of the Batman Eternal series; she is seen tied up in a vault by Selina Kyle, with Kyle stating she is the only one who knows how to stop what is coming next for Gotham. In Batman Eternal #3 (July 2014), Stephanie is a purple-clad teen who stumbles into a meeting between her father, the Cluemaster, and his criminal associates. She manages to escape their murderous plot, and over the course of the series, works to "spoil" her father's plans by becoming a vigilante, calling herself the "Spoiler." At first, she merely attempts to spread news of the Cluemaster's plans on the internet, then works actively as a costumed crimefighter to capture and foil him. Following the Batman Eternal storyline, Brown as Spoiler helped other teens fight the Joker's chaos in Detective Comics: Endgame, and sought training from Selina Kyle and Eiko Hasigawa in Catwoman. In the aftermath of the gang war in that title, Barbara Gordon took Stephanie under her wing for a time. Stephanie also appeared as Spoiler fighting the supervillain Mother alongside the Robins in Batman and Robin Eternal.

DC Rebirth
In DC Rebirth, the 2016 relaunch of DC Comics, Stephanie was recruited into Batman's emergency response team headed by Batwoman, along with Red Robin, Orphan (Cassandra Cain), and Clayface. After Red Robin is "killed" by Jacob Kane's Colony drones, Stephanie becomes depressed and questions her purpose and the world she wants to live in the "Victim Syndicate" storyline. The story ends with her challenging the rest of the team and threatening to expose their secret identities if they don't give up their vigilantism. After disarming her by refusing her offer, she leaves the team and tells Batman that until he gives up his cowl, she'll be standing in his way. Stephanie actively opposes Batman and his allies in the field, while still fighting criminals like Wrath. It also appears that she is falling under the influence of Anarky, who is attempting to build a (literally) underground society of people who were impacted by Batman's activities. Eventually, Stephanie sees through Anarky's lies and helps Batman apprehend him. However, she walks away from Batman before he can tell her that Tim Drake is still alive.

After discovering Tim is alive, she briefly rejoins the team to help them stop the Victim Syndicate, but leaves again after the death of Clayface and breaks up with Tim since he was consistently dishonest about his intent to remain Red Robin instead of attending Ivy University. When Ulysses Hadrian Armstrong, the General, infects Tim with the OMAC nanites and threatens to control Gotham, Batman and Cassandra ask Stephanie for help, and she reluctantly agrees. Using her drones, she leads an infiltration into the General's Belfry 2.0 stronghold, and hacks into the system to shut it down. The evil AI Brother Eye confronts her with images of her past in the alternate timeline from which Batman Tim Drake from the future appeared, mocking her as "lesser" than a timeline where she was both Robin and Batgirl. Instead of being cast down, Steph laughs and cracks into the timeline history that Brother Eye and the General have been using to manipulate Tim, showing him the truth, and convincing him to destroy the OMACs himself. After the dust settles, Tim decides to investigate the divergence in timelines Steph discovered, and she joins him in his quest.

Joker War 
During The Joker War, Stephanie and Cassandra fight the Hench Master in Bludhaven. At the end of the story, both she and Stephanie reclaim their Bat symbols. Stephanie receives a new costume, which is an amalgamation of her Spoiler outfit and her previous Batgirl suit.

Infinite Frontier 
In :Infinite Frontier:, Barbara Gordon – now primarily operating as Oracle again – explains to Huntress that Stephanie and Cassandra will share the Batgirl title, but that she reserves the right to occasionally suit up as Batgirl in future. In Batman: Urban Legends, it is revealed she and Tim broke up and are not speaking, although she is supportive when he comes out as bisexual and starts dating Bernard Dowd.

In 2022, Stephanie and Cassandra received a series called Batgirls by Becky Cloonan and Michael W. Conrad where they take up residence in one of Gotham's poorer areas after Fear State made them fugitives. Stephanie and Cassandra acquire a new vehicle they name Bondo.

Powers and abilities
Like most of the Batman family, Stephanie Brown has no superhuman powers. She has been trained extensively by Batgirl, Batman, and the Birds of Prey in martial arts, acrobatics, strength training, interrogation, and detective skills. She carries a belt similar to that used by other Gotham vigilantes containing a grappling hook, tracking devices, and various other crime-fighting paraphernalia. During Gotham Underground, the Penguin gave her an unknown device that allowed her to become completely invisible. According to Tim Drake, this "ability" was achieved through stolen technology. According to Batgirl writer Bryan Q. Miller, the ability to become invisible has not been incorporated into Stephanie's Batgirl costume.

After Stephanie took on the Batgirl identity, Barbara Gordon designed a new costume for Stephanie more in line with the rest of the Bat-family's. It is equipped with kevlar and carbon fiber-reinforced polymer to protect against ballistic, flame, and electrical attacks. Stephanie's Batsuit also carries a wireless relay within the cowl, permitting her to remain in contact with Barbara. The suit also allows Barbara to monitor Stephanie's vital signs. Stephanie now also uses a collapsible bo staff, similar to the one that Tim Drake uses. It is implied that she had been trained by Cassandra Cain in using it before assuming the Batgirl mantle.

Other versions
 In the alternate World Without Young Justice timeline, Stephanie was Robin instead of Tim Drake.
 A toddler version of Stephanie appears in Tiny Titans. She is a close friend of Cassandra Cain and Barbara Gordon.
 As part of The New 52: Futures End September tie-in event, Stephanie, along with Cassandra Cain and Tiffany Fox, serves as part of "The League of Batgirls" under the leadership of Barbara Gordon (going by "Bête Noire") in The New 52: Future's End: Batgirl #1. She speaks with the quippy dialogue seen in her Batgirl title, and uses a "gooperang," one of her trademark weapons in that run. According to Gail Simone, she consulted with Bryan Q. Miller on Stephanie's portrayal.
 In the final issue of the alternate universe series Bombshells United, Catwoman tells Bruce Wayne of a girl all in purple who spoils the best laid plans of crooks and villains in Gotham.
 Young Justice (2019) introduces an Earth-Three version of Stephanie Brown serves as her world's Batwoman. Despite the generally reversed moralities of Earth-Three, this Stephanie appears to be a hero.
Stephanie makes an appearance as Spoiler in The Batman & Scooby-Doo Mysteries #12.
In the possible future, Future State, Stephanie primarily stars in backups in Future State: The Next Batman where ends up in prison as a con to get information on the villains locked up in there. She has an eyepatch and short hair, and it is implied she and Cassandra Cain used to be a couple. She also appears in Future State: Robin Eternal which is set before The Next Batman. She has further appearances in Future State: Nightwing and the ongoing series, Future State: Gotham.

In other media

Television
 Stephanie Brown / Spoiler appears in Young Justice, voiced by Mae Whitman. Following her introduction in the second season episode "Before the Dawn" as a civilian who was abducted by the Reach and rescued by the Team, she returns in the third season initially as a member of the latter group before joining Batman Incorporated in resigning from the Justice League to counter U.N. secretary general Lex Luthor's restrictions on the League. By the end of the season, Batman Inc. rejoins the League.
 Stephanie Brown appears in the Batwoman episode "I'll Give You a Clue", portrayed by Morgan Kohan. This version is a redhead and technological genius who develops an interest in Luke Fox.
 Stephanie Brown appears in a photograph in the Titans episode "Barbara Gordon" as one of Dick Grayson's potential Robin candidates.
 Stephanie Brown appears in Gotham Knights, portrayed by Anna Lore. This version is the best friend of Bruce Wayne's adoptive son and series original character Turner Hayes.

Video games
 Stephanie Brown / Spoiler appears as an unlockable character in Lego Batman: The Videogame.
 Stephanie Brown as Spoiler, Batgirl, and Robin appears in Scribblenauts Unmasked: A DC Comics Adventure.
 Stephanie Brown / Spoiler appears as a DLC character in Lego Batman 3: Beyond Gotham.
 Stephanie Brown / Spoiler appears as an unlockable character in DC Legends.

Miscellaneous
 Two incarnations of Stephanie Brown appear in All-New Batman: The Brave and the Bold #13, with the Phantom Stranger summoning Brown as Robin, among other Robins, to help Batman and Madame Xanadu showing the Stranger a team of Batgirls, with Brown among their ranks.
 The Batwoman incarnation of Stephanie Brown appears in the Arrowverse tie-in comic Earth-Prime #1.

Collected editions
Stephanie Brown as Spoiler/Robin:

Issues not collected into TPB/HC format:

Detective Comics Vol. 1 #647–649

Robin Vol 4: #15–16; #25–26; #35; #40–41; #43–45; #50; #54; #56–62; #64–65; #74–75; #80; #82–84; #87–88; #92–95; #100–105; #107–113; #116; #119–120

Batgirl Vol. 1 #31–32; #38; #53–55

Young Justice Vol. 1 #30; #49–51; #54

Batman Vol. 1 #713

Nightwing Vol. 2 #75

Batman and the outsiders Vol 2 #13

Supergirl Vol. 4 #60

Convergence Vol. 1 #1

Convergence Batgirl Vol. 1 #1

Detective Comics: Endgame Vol. 1 #1

Stephanie Brown as Batgirl:

See also

Character lists
List of Batman supporting characters

Concepts and themes
Girl Heroes
Girl Power
Portrayal of women in comics
Women warriors in literature and culture
Women in Refrigerators

References

External links

GirlWonder.org Host of "Project Girl Wonder"
Spoiler at the Unofficial Guide to the DC Universe

Batman characters
Comics characters introduced in 1992
DC Comics sidekicks
DC Comics female superheroes
DC Comics martial artists 
DC Comics child superheroes
Fictional acrobats
Fictional detectives
Fictional stick-fighters
Fictional teenage parents
Fictional hackers
Fictional characters who can turn invisible
Characters created by Chuck Dixon
Characters created by Tom Lyle
Robin (character)
Batgirl
Vigilante characters in comics
Fictional women soldiers and warriors